Ornithoptera allotei is the name given to a birdwing butterfly that is a natural hybrid between Ornithoptera victoriae and Ornithoptera priamus urvillianus. Despite the fact that hybrids do not warrant a binomial name, the name Ornithoptera allotei persists from the original description of the butterfly as a species.

The hybrid is known from Bougainville Island and Malaita Island, where the ranges of both parent species overlap.

This butterfly is, because of its rarity, one of the most valuable in the world, with male specimens typically selling for more than £4,000 (US$7,000). It is said to be an ideal candidate for commercial exploitation because its parents are not rare on Bougainville Island, and they may be easily induced to mate with one another.

History
O. allotei was described by Walter Rothschild in 1914 as a species, despite the assertion by its discoverer, Abbé Allotte, a priest at the Buin Mission, Bougainville Island, that it was a natural hybrid.

It was originally placed in the genus Troides. The female was described by H. M. Peebles and W. Schmassmann in 1917.

Schmid (1970), McAlpine (1970) and Haugum & Low (1978) all held the hybrid theory but the final proof of O. allotei being a natural hybrid was made by Ramón Straatman (Jan Haugum in Papilio International (1990)).

See also
 Ornithoptera akakeae
 Troides mixtum

References

 Racheli, T., 1980. A list of the Papilionidae (Lepidoptera) of the Solomon Islands, with notes on their geographical distribution. Australian Entomological Magazine. 7; 45-59. Summary of views of taxonomy of O. allotei

External links

 Nagypal, image gallery

Allotei